Sales Oliveira is a municipality in the state of São Paulo in Brazil. The population is 11,998 (2020 est.) in an area of 306 km². The elevation is 730 m.

References

Municipalities in São Paulo (state)